Pope Sisinnius (c. 6504 February 708) was the bishop of Rome from 15 January 708 to his death.

Sisinnius was born in Tyre (modern-day Lebanon), and his father's name was John. The paucity of donations to the papacy during his reign (42 pounds of gold and 310 pounds of silver, a fraction of the personal donations of other contemporary pontiffs) indicate that he was probably not from the aristocracy.

Sisinnius was selected as pope during the period of Byzantine domination, succeeding John VII after a vacancy of three months. He was consecrated around 15 January 708. His pontificate lasted just twenty days. According to the Catholic Encyclopedia, "although he was so afflicted with gout that he was unable even to feed himself, he is nevertheless said to have been a man of strong character, and to have been able to take thought for the good of the city". Among his few acts as pope was the consecration of a bishop for Corsica. He also ordered "that lime be burned in order to restore portions" of the walls of Rome. The restoration of the walls planned by Sisinnius was eventually carried out by Gregory II.

Sisinnius was buried in Old St. Peter's Basilica. He was succeeded less than two months later by Constantine, who some historians believe was his brother.

Notes

References

Ekonomou, Andrew J. 2007. Byzantine Rome and the Greek Popes: Eastern influences on Rome and the papacy from Gregory the Great to Zacharias, A.D. 590–752. Lexington Books.

 

7th-century births
708 deaths
Popes
Asian popes
Syrian popes
Popes of the Byzantine Papacy
8th-century archbishops
8th-century popes
7th-century people
Burials at St. Peter's Basilica